The 2016 FA Community Shield (also known as The FA Community Shield supported by McDonald's for sponsorship reasons) was the 94th FA Community Shield, an annual English football match played between the winners of the previous season's Premier League and FA Cup. The match was contested by 2015–16 FA Cup winners Manchester United, and Leicester City, champions of the 2015–16 Premier League. It was held at Wembley Stadium a week before the Premier League season kicked off. Manchester United won the match 2–1 with goals from Jesse Lingard and Zlatan Ibrahimović, either side of a goal from Leicester striker Jamie Vardy.

Background
Leicester City qualified as champions of the 2015–16 Premier League. They won the title after then-second place Tottenham Hotspur drew 2–2 to Chelsea in Stamford Bridge on 2 May 2016. It was only their second FA Charity/Community Shield, first since 1971, when they defeated Liverpool 1–0. It was also the first time they played as champions/runners–up of either top division league or FA Cup winners, as they played in 1971 as Second Division champions.

Manchester United qualified as winners of the 2015–16 FA Cup. They defeated Crystal Palace 2–1 after extra time on 21 May 2016 to win their 12th title (tying the then-record with Arsenal). It was their 30th FA Charity/Community Shield, winning a record 20.

The previous match between the two sides was a 1–1 draw at Old Trafford on 1 May 2016. Anthony Martial scored for United in the eighth minute, while Leicester captain Wes Morgan equalised nine minutes later.

Manchester United manager José Mourinho returned to the Community Shield for the second straight year, after managing for Chelsea in the 2015 FA Community Shield.

Match

Summary
Jesse Lingard opened the scoring in the 32nd minute when he ran and got past three Leicester players before shooting low with his right foot past the onrushing Leicester goalkeeper Kasper Schmeichel who managed to get something on the shot but could not prevent it going into the net. Jamie Vardy made it 1–1 in the 52nd minute when he intercepted Marouane Fellaini's no-look back-pass before rounding David de Gea and slotting the ball low to the net with his left foot. Zlatan Ibrahimović got the winning goal for Manchester United in the 83rd minute when he got above Leicester captain Wes Morgan and headed in from six yards out into the right corner off the post after a cross from the right by Antonio Valencia.

Details

See also
2016–17 Premier League
2016–17 FA Cup

References

FA Community Shield
Charity Shield 2016
Charity Shield 2016
Community Shield
Community Shield
Events at Wembley Stadium
Community Shield